Alberto Ongaro (22 August 1925 – 23 March 2018), also known by his pseudonym Alfredo Nogara, was an Italian journalist, writer and comics writer.

Biography
Born in Venice, Italy, he lived for a long time in South America and England, before returning to Venice in 1979.

A friend and collaborator of Hugo Pratt, he also worked for Il Corriere dei Piccoli. As a journalist, he was a foreign correspondent of L'Europeo, and he also wrote historical and adventure books, including La taverna del doge Loredan (1980), La partita (1986) and Il ponte della solita ora (2006). Ongaro died in Venice on 23 March 2018, aged 92.

References

External links
Online biography 
Interview with Alberto Ongaro 

1925 births
2018 deaths
Writers from Venice
Italian male writers
Italian comics writers
Italian journalists
Italian male journalists
Premio Campiello winners